John Babington Macaulay Baxter  (February 16, 1868 – December 27, 1946) was a New Brunswick lawyer, jurist and the 19th premier of New Brunswick. 

Baxter served in the Canadian Army and was the author of Historical Records of the New Brunswick Regiment, Royal Artillery, the unit he commanded from 1907 to 1912. He also had a keen interest in genealogy and in 1943 the New Brunswick Museum published his book titled Simon Baxter - The first United Empire Loyalist to settle in New Brunswick, (Canada).

Born in Saint John, New Brunswick, John Baxter served on the municipal council for eighteen years from 1892 to 1910. A Conservative Party member, he was elected to the 32nd New Brunswick Legislative Assembly in 1911. He was appointed Attorney-General of the province, holding that office from 1915 to 1917. He entered federal politics and served as Minister of Customs and Excise under Prime Minister Arthur Meighen in 1921 before taking over the leadership of the provincial Conservative party and leading it to victory in 1925.

Baxter was a leader of the Maritime Rights Movement which expressed the discontent felt by the maritime provinces concerning their loss of influence in the Canadian confederation dominated by the provinces of Quebec and Ontario. 

He left politics in 1931 and was appointed Chief Justice of the New Brunswick Supreme Court in 1935 serving until his death. His son, John B. M. Baxter, Jr., later served in the cabinet of Richard Hatfield. He is the great grandfather of Luke Macaulay Baxter, the son of Kirk Macaulay Baxter.

He died in West Saint John in 1946 at 78.

References

Further reading
 Arthur T. Doyle, Front Benches and Back Rooms: A story of corruption, muckraking, raw partisanship and political intrigue in New Brunswick, Toronto: Green Tree Publishing, 1976.

External links
 
 Government of New Brunswick biography 

1868 births
1946 deaths
Premiers of New Brunswick
Members of the House of Commons of Canada from New Brunswick
Conservative Party of Canada (1867–1942) MPs
Lawyers in New Brunswick
Judges in New Brunswick
Members of the King's Privy Council for Canada
Saint John, New Brunswick city councillors
Canadian King's Counsel